The Shetland Sheepdog, often known as the Sheltie, is a breed of herding dog that originated in the Shetland Islands of Scotland. The original name was Shetland Collie, but this caused controversy amongst Rough Collie breeders of the time, so the breed's name was formally changed. This diligent small dog is clever, vocal, excitable and willing to please. They are incredibly trustworthy to their owners to the point where they are often referred to as "shadows" due to their attachment to family. This breed was formally recognized by The Kennel Club (UK) in 1909.

Like the Shetland pony, Shetland cattle and the Shetland sheep, the Shetland Sheepdog is a hardy but diminutive breed developed to thrive amidst the harsh and meagre conditions of its native islands.  While the Sheltie still excels at herding, today it is often raised as a working dog and/or family pet.

The Sheltie's origins are obscure, but it is not a direct descendant of the Rough Collie, which it largely resembles. Rather, the Sheltie is a descendant of small specimens of the Scottish Collie and the King Charles Spaniel. In the early 20th century, James Loggie added a small Rough Collie to the breeding stock, and helped establish the breed that would become the modern Shetland Sheepdog.

History

Unlike many miniature breeds that resemble their larger counterparts, this breed was not developed simply by selectively breeding the Rough Collie for smaller and smaller size. The original sheepdog of Shetland was a Spitz-type dog, probably similar to the modern Icelandic Sheepdog. This dog was crossed with mainland working collies brought to the islands, and then after being brought to England, it was further extensively crossed with the Rough Collie, and other breeds including some or all of the extinct Greenland Yakki, the King Charles Spaniel (not the Cavalier), the Pomeranian,  and possibly the Border Collie.  The original Spitz-type working sheepdog of Shetland is now extinct, having been replaced for herding there by the Border Collie. Shelties were used for herding until commercial livestock farming required larger breeds.

When the breed was originally introduced breeders called them Shetland Collies, which upset Rough Collie breeders, so the name was changed to Shetland Sheepdog. During the early 20th century (up until the 1940s), additional crosses were made to Rough Collies to help retain the desired Rough Collie type – in fact, the first English Sheltie champion's dam, Gesta, was a rough Collie.
The year 1909 marked the initial recognition of the Sheltie by the English Kennel Club, with the first registered Sheltie being a female called Badenock Rose.  The first Sheltie to be registered by the American Kennel Club was "Lord Scott" in 1911.

Description

The general appearance of the Sheltie is that of a miniature Rough Collie. They are a small, double coated, working dog, agile and sturdy. Blue merle Shelties may have blue eyes or one brown and one blue eye, but all others have dark-colored eyes. Their expression should be that of alertness with a gentle and sometimes reserved nature. They are often very good with children. They carry their tail down low, only lifted when alert and never carried over the back. They are an intensely loyal breed, sometimes reserved with strangers but should not be shy or showing timidness as per the AKC breed standard.

Coat and colors

Shelties have a double coat, which means that they have two layers of fur that make up their coat. The long, rough guard hairs lie on top of a thick, soft undercoat.  The guard hairs are water-repellent, while the undercoat provides relief from both high and low temperatures.

The English Kennel Club describes three different colors: "tricolor, blue merle, and sable (ranging from golden through mahogany), marked with varying amounts of white and/or tan." Essentially, however, a blue merle dog is a genetically black dog, either black, white, and tan (tricolor). In the show ring, blue merles may have blue eyes; all other colors must have brown eyes.

Basic coat colors

Sable – Sable is dominant over other colors. May be pure for sable (two sable genes) or may be tri-factored or bi-factored (carrying one sable gene and one tricolor or bicolor gene). "Tri-factored" sable and "shaded" sable are not interchangeable terms. A shaded dog (one with a lot of black overlay on a sable coat) may or may not be tri-factored or bi-factored.
Tricolor – black, white, and tan. Tricolor is dominant over bi-black, and may carry the factor for bicolor.
Bi-black – black and white. Bi-black is recessive. A bi-black Sheltie carries two bi-black genes; thus any dog with a bi-black parent is always bi-factored whatever its own coat color is.

'Modified' coat colors
Any of the above colors may also have a color modification gene. The color modification genes are merling and white factoring. Merling dilutes the base color (sable, tricolor, or bi-black) causing a black dog's coat to show a mix of black, white, and grey hairs, often with black patches.

 Blue merle—blue, white and tan. A tricolor with the merling gene. May have blue eyes.
 Bi-blue—blue and white. A bi-black with the merling gene. May have blue eyes.
 Sable merle—faded or mottled sable and white. Often born with a mottled coat of darker brown over lighter brown, they usually present as a faded or lighter sable or can appear as a washed-out blue-merle. Sable merles are shown in the breed ring as sables; therefore, blue eyes are a major fault in AKC. Blue eyes are not faulted in sable merles in UKC.

Double merles, a product of breeding two merle Shelties together, have a very high incidence of deafness or blindness.

There have been reports of a brindle Sheltie but many Sheltie enthusiasts agree that a cross sometime in the ancestry of that specific Sheltie could have produced a brindle. Unacceptable colors in the show ring are a rustiness in a blue or black coat. Colors may not be faded, no conspicuous white spots, and the color cannot be over 50 percent white.

Height and weight
In general, males are taller and heavier than females. Accepted height ranges may differ depending on country and standard used. Variation can be found within litters, and height (in the range of ) is above the breed standard in some lines.

Ears
To conform to the breed standards, the Shelties' ears should bend slightly or "tip." The ear is to have the top third to a quarter of the ear tipped. If a dog's ears are not bent (referred to as prick ears) some owners brace them into the correct position for several weeks to several months. Wide-set (too much distance between) ears are also not a desired trait, nor are ears which tip too low down (referred to as 'hound' ears). The overall expression should convey the breed's alert and intelligent disposition

Grooming

Shelties have a double coat, and often shed a lot of the time, no matter the season. The topcoat consists of long, straight, water-repellent hair, which provides protection from cold and the elements. The undercoat is short, furry and very dense and helps to keep the dog warm. Mats can be commonly found behind the ears, under the elbow on each front leg, and in the fluffy fur on the hind legs (the "skirts"), as well as around the collar (if worn). The coat is usually shed twice a year, often in spring and autumn. Females will also shed right before or right after giving birth. Male shelties technically shed less than females but fur still comes off constantly. Shaving these dogs is very bad for their skin and some do not regrow any significant amount of hair after being shaved, a condition known as alopecia.  Spaying or neutering can alter coat texture, making it softer, more prone to matting and even more profuse. Shelties shed in clumps which can be pulled or brushed out of the main coat, rather than individual hair. This makes them much easier to groom and clean up after than many smooth-haired dogs, which leave loose fur in their space.

Temperament

Shelties have a high level of intelligence. According to Dr. Stanley Coren, an expert on animal intelligence, the Shetland Sheepdog is one of the brightest dogs, ranking 6th out of 138 breeds tested. His research found that an average Sheltie could understand a new command in fewer than five repetitions and would obey a command the first time it was given 95% of the time or better.

Health

For the most part, Shelties are athletic and healthy. Like the Rough Collie, there is a tendency toward inherited malformation and disease of the eyes. Each individual puppy should have its eyes examined by a qualified veterinary ophthalmologist. Some lines may be susceptible to hypothyroidism, epilepsy, hip dysplasia, or skin allergies.

Shetland Sheepdogs have four times the risk of other dogs of developing transitional cell carcinoma, a cancer of the bladder.

Dermatomyositis may occur at the age of 4 to 6 months, and is frequently misdiagnosed by general practice veterinarians as sarcoptic or demodectic mange. The disease manifests itself as alopecia on the top of the head, supra- and suborbital area and forearms as well as the tip of the tail.  If the disease progresses to its more damaging form, it could affect the autonomic nervous system and the dog may have to be euthanised.  This disease is genetically transmitted and recessive, with breeders having no clear methodology for screening except clear bloodline records.  Deep tissue biopsies are required to definitively diagnose dermatomyositis.  Lay assessment of end-stage dermatomyositis is observed difficulty or inability to swallow, even water.

Von Willebrand disease is an inherited bleeding disorder. In Shelties, affected dogs as a general rule are not viable and do not live long. The Sheltie carries type III of von Willebrands, which is the most severe of the three levels. There are DNA tests that were developed to find von Willebrands in Shelties. It can be done at any age, and it will give three results: affected, carrier or non-affected.

Although small breed dogs do not usually suffer unduly from hip dysplasia, it has been identified in Shelties. Hip dysplasia occurs when the head of the femur and the acetabulum do not fit together correctly, frequently causing pain or lameness.  Hip dysplasia is thought to be genetic. Many breeders will have their dogs' hips x-rayed and certified by the Orthopedic Foundation for Animals.

Eyes
The two basic forms of inherited eye diseases/defects in Shelties are Collie eye anomaly (CEA) and progressive retinal atrophy (PRA).

Collie eye anomaly: An autosomal recessive inherited trait which results in incomplete closure of the embryonic fissure; seen almost exclusively in Collies, Border Collies and Shetland Sheepdogs. CEA can be detected in young puppies by a veterinary ophthalmologist.  The disease involves the retina. It is always bilateral although the severity may be disparate (unequal) between eyes. Other accompanying defects (ophthalmic anomalies) may wrongly indicate a more severe manifestation of CEA. CEA is present at birth and although it cannot be cured, it doesn't progress. Signs of CEA in shelties are small, or deepset eyes. That is, the severity of the disease at birth will not change throughout the dog's life. CEA is scored similar to the way hips are.

CEA is genetic, inheritance is autosomal recessive, this means that even a dog that shows no phenotypic signs of the condition may be a carrier. Breeders should actively try to breed this disease out by only breeding with dogs that have "clear" eyes or very low scoring eyes.  A CEA score considered too high to breed with may still be low enough not to affect the dog's life. These dogs live happy and healthy lives as pets but should be not used for breeding. The recent development of a DNA test for CEA makes control of this disease much more likely as more breeders take advantage of the test.

PRA can be detected at any time but usually does not show up until the dog is around two years old. Breeding dogs should be tested for genotype for this condition before breeding and only animals found "clear" should be used for breeding. PRA can occur in most breeds of dog including mix breeds. In most breeds it is also an autosomal recessive condition, however it has been found in other breeds to be autosomal dominant and sex-linked in others. As the name suggests, it is a progressive disease which will eventually result in total blindness.  Like CEA, an affected dog should not be bred with but these dogs can live happily as pets. Currently there is no treatment for either disease, but as both diseases (CEA and PRA) are hereditary it is possible to eliminate them using selective breeding.

Breeding
As with all dogs, Shelties should be screened for inheritable genetic diseases before breeding. Both male and female should be tested for thyroid problems, Von Willebrands disease and brucellosis, as well as have hip x-rays and eyes cleared by the relevant national authorities.

Breeding colours are also a problem for many beginner breeders.  Certain colour combinations can produce unwanted or potentially harmful results, such as mating blue merle to blue merle, which can produce what is called a "double merle", more likely to be deaf or blind. Mating a sable and white to a blue merle can produce a sable merle, which is undesirable for the show ring.  A tri-colour to a pure-for-sable (a sable and white which can produce only other sable and whites), will produce only sable and whites, but they will be tri-factored sable and whites (which means they have the tri-gene.)  There are many more examples of breeding for colour, so a good breeder will research colour genetics prior to breeding.  There are many different genes contributing to the different colours of the Sheltie, including the bi gene, the merling gene, the sable gene, and the tricolour gene.

MDR1 gene mutation
According to the College of Veterinary Medicine at Washington State University, the Shetland Sheepdog, and many other herding breeds, have a risk of being born with a MDR1 Gene Mutation, with about 15 percent of individuals affected. Cross-breeds are also affected. Dogs carrying Mdr1-1 share a common ancestor that experienced remarkable evolutionary success, having contributed genetically to at least nine distinct breeds of dog. Due to this genetic mutation, affected dogs may exhibit sensitivity or adverse reactions to many drugs, including acepromazine, butorphanol, doxorubicin, erythromycin, ivermectin, loperamide, milbemycin, moxidectin, rifampin, selamectin, vinblastine, and vincristine.

Working life
As the name suggests, Shelties can and have been used as sheepdogs and still participate in sheepdog trials to this day. Herding dogs conduct livestock from one place to another by causing fear-flocking and flight behaviour. The instinct to herd is primarily a product of breeding. No amount of training can substitute this trait.

Shelties can also be great therapy dogs for those who need comfort during hard times such as natural disasters or severe illness.  This breed is rarely aggressive and tends to do well with children and being handled by them.

Activities
In their size group, the breed dominates dog agility, obedience, showmanship, flyball, tracking, and herding. Herding instincts and trainability can be measured at noncompetitive herding tests. Shelties exhibiting basic herding instincts can be trained to compete in herding trials.

Famous Shetland Sheepdogs
 Ch Halstor's Peter Pumpkin ROM - The Shetland sheepdog sire with the most Champions (160).
 Badenock Rose - the first Shetland sheepdog registered with the English Kennel Club.
Mickey - main character of Canadian children's series Mickey's Farm

See also

Shetland animal breeds

References

FCI breeds
Herding dogs
Dog breeds originating in Scotland
Shetland animal breeds